The Wild Numbers is a mathematical fiction in the form of a short novel by Philibert Schogt, a Dutch philosopher and mathematician. It was first published in Dutch (as "De wilde getallen") in 1998 and an English translation appeared in 2000. Through this  work the author is trying to provide insights to the workings of a  mathematics-obsessed mind. It is the story of a professor of mathematics who believes he has solved one of the great problems of mathematics -- Beauregard's Wild Number Problem.  In the imaginary settings of the novel, the problem is presented as a real mathematical problem seeking a solution and not as a delusion of the protagonist. But in the real mathematical world, there is no such problem; it is a fictitious problem created by the author  of the book.

Plot

The novel is presented as a narration by the protagonist, Isaac Swift, of the story. Isaac Swift is an able, though not brilliant, mathematics professor in a small college in an unnamed city in an unnamed country. When the novel opens Swift is in his mid-thirties  and desperately trying to establish himself as a mathematician.  A respected senior faculty of the mathematics department of the college has just given his seal of approval to Isaac's paper describing a proof of the wild number problem.  Isaac hoped that he would soon be famous and interviewed and feted. Immediately a crisis developed as Swift was accused of plagiarising a proof of the problem already discovered by an older student, Leonard Vale. Vale's accusation was generally ignored because of his cranky behaviour in the department and his tendency to make tall claims on unsolved problems.

Reviews

See also
Wild number

References

Novels about mathematics
1998 novels
20th-century Dutch novels